Nadkole  is a village in the administrative district of Gmina Łochów, within Węgrów County, Masovian Voivodeship, in east-central Poland.

The village has a population of 90. Its most famous native was Eugeniusz Rudnik (1932-2016).

References

Nadkole